Puss in the corner may refer to:

Puss in the corner (children's game)
Puss in the Corner, patience or solitaire card game
"Les quatre coins", from Jeux d'enfants
A quilt square pattern